El Show de los Sueños: Amigos del alma was the second season of the Peruvian reality show El show de los sueños. In this season, every team (conformed by a celebrity and two best friends) should dance and sing. The winners were Anna Carina, Carlos (dancer) and Gabriela (singer).

Cast

Teams

Scoring charts

Average score chart
This table only counts performances scored on a 40-point scale.

Highest and lowest scoring
The highest and lowest scores are based on the 40-point scale.

References

2009 television seasons